Mycena citricolor is a species of mushroom-forming fungus in the family Mycenaceae. It is a plant pathogen producing leaf spots on coffee plants. This fungus causes the disease commonly known as American Leaf Spot. Mycena citricolor affects coffee plants, primarily in Latin America, but can grow on other plants as well. This fungus can grow on all parts of the coffee plant including the leaves, stems and fruits. When grown on the leaves, Mycena citricolor results in leaves with holes that often fall from the plant.

Description
The Mycena fungus can be identified growing on somewhat circular, brown spots on coffee leaves. The brown spots are caused by the presence of the parasitic fungus and by looking at the leaves closely, small mushrooms with luminescence can be seen.  The fungi's luminescence is active in the presence and absence of light.  Its luminescence is also affected by the temperature of its environment.

See also
 List of bioluminescent fungi

References

citricolor
Fungi described in 1868
Bioluminescent fungi
Fungal plant pathogens and diseases
Taxa named by Miles Joseph Berkeley
Taxa named by Moses Ashley Curtis